Andrew Prowse was an Australian editor, writer and director of film and television. He was nominated for Best Editing at the 1986 AFI Awards for Playing Beatie Bow. Prowse was also co-producer of the 2014 telemovie INXS: Never Tear Us Apart.

Prowse died in December 2018.

Select credits
Midnite Spares (1983)
Playing Beatie Bow (1986)
Fair Game (1986)
Run Chrissie Run! (1986)
The Time Guardian (1987)
Driving Force (1989)
The Siege of Firebase Gloria (1989)
Demonstone (1990)
 Ultraman: Towards the Future (1990) 
Farscape (1999 - 2004)
Heatstroke  (2008)

References

External links

2018 deaths
Australian film directors
Australian television directors
Year of birth missing